Virginia Ruano Pascual and Paola Suárez were the defending champions, but had different outcomes. While Suárez did not compete this year, Ruano Pascual teamed up with Conchita Martínez and successfully defended her title, by defeating Iveta Benešová and Květa Peschke 6–1, 6–4 in the final.

It was the 12th doubles title for Martínez and the 32rd doubles title for Ruano Pascual, in their respective careers.

Seeds
The first four seeds received a bye into the second round.

Draw

Finals

Top half

Bottom half

External links
 Main and Qualifying rounds

Charleston Open
Family Circle Cup - Doubles